The Bazaar of Bad Dreams is a short fiction collection by Stephen King, published on November 3, 2015. This is King's sixth collection of short stories and his tenth collection overall. One of the stories, "Obits", won the 2016 Edgar Award for best short story, and the collection itself won the 2015 Shirley Jackson Award for best collection. The paperback edition, released on October 18, 2016, includes a bonus short story, "Cookie Jar", which was published in 2016 in VQR.

Background
In a letter posted on Stephen King's official site in June 2014, King announced that he would possibly be publishing a "book of new stories" in the fall of 2015, following the publication of Finders Keepers. In an interview with the Toronto Sun on November 6, 2014, King announced the title of the collection and offered more details, saying "[I]n the fall of 2015 there will be a new collection of stories called The Bazaar of Bad Dreams, which'll collect about 20 short tales. It should be a pretty fat book." In February and March 2015, King personally, and via his assistant, confirmed the collection will include "Bad Little Kid" (published in 2014 as an e-book in French and German languages only as a gift to King's European fans), "Ur" (heavily revised), "Drunken Fireworks", and "A Death". The complete list of twenty stories was announced on King's website on April 20. Throughout May, King's official site revealed the cover in five stages, with the final cover being unveiled on May 22. The Bazaar of Bad Dreams omits contemporaneous stories published by King in collaboration with his son Joe Hill (Throttle and In the Tall Grass) and Stewart O'Nan (A Face in the Crowd).

Stories collected

See also
 Stephen King short fiction bibliography
 Unpublished and uncollected works by Stephen King

References

2015 short story collections
American short story collections
Short story collections by Stephen King
Nightmares in fiction
Charles Scribner's Sons books